Parácuaro  is a municipality of Michoacán, Mexico. It is a Purépecha word for "place that has sticks for a roof".

History

In the Pre-Hispanic era, Parácuaro is thought to have been inhabited by Nahuas and later conquered by chief Tarasco Utucuma.

During the colonial period, the Spanish included Parácuaro in Republic of the Indias and developed the haciendas La Guadalupe, El Valle y La Perla.

From 10 December 1831, Parácuaro appears as Apatzingán's possession and approximately 30 years later on 20 November 1861 it was constituted in municipality by the Congress of the State. It as called Villa de Parácuaro de Morelos.

Population
 
25,582 inhabitants.

Geography

Location

It is located in the southwest region of the state at 19° 8'45.83" N and 102°13'9.68" W at a height of 600 meters above sea level. It is bordered on the north by Tancítaro and New Parangaricutiro, on the east by Gabriel Zamora and Múgica, and on the south and the west by Apatzingán. It is 200 km from the capital of Michoacán.

Topography

Its relief is constituted by the mountain chain of the volcanic transverse system and Tepalcatepec's - Balsa's depression, the hills of Aguacate, Jabalí, Cofradía, Güera, Vueltas, Batea and White.

Hydrography

Its hydrography is constituted by rivers: Aguacate, Orejón, Lancita, Paracuarito and Manga and the springs of cold water, of the Chicos, the Pozos and Cortijo.

Climate

It is tropical, with rains in summer. It has an annual rainfall of 800 millimeters and temperatures that range from 14 to 36 °C.

Principal ecosystems

In the municipality, tropical forest vegetation predominates, with tepeguaje, guaje, ceiba, parota, zapote and mango. The tropical thorny forest, with teteche, viejito, huisache and amole.

Economy

Agriculture

The principal crops are cotton, rice, corn, melon, sorghum, sesame, tomato, cucumber and watermelon.

Ranching

Cattle, horses and pigs are raised.

Tourism

There are two resorts.

Trade

Parácuaro is self-sufficient in basic products, and emphasizes the marketing of fruits, groceries and vegetables.

Services

In the Paracuaro's municipal office you can find service of accommodations, bungalows and food service.

Personalities

The best-known person from the town is Alberto Aguilera Valadez, who is better known by his stage name, Juan Gabriel. Romualdo Bucío Bucío, whose stage name is Agustín Bernal, was a prolific actor and director, whose influence on Mexican film has been compared to that of Arnold Schwarzenegger and Sylvester Stalone to Hollywood. Actress Elpidia Carrillo was born in this town as well, coincidentally Elpidia is best known for her role as lead actress in Predator (1987) where she acted alongside Arnold Schwarzenegger.

Cultural and tourist attractions

Architectural monuments

Parácuaro's parish and monument to Cenobio Moreno.

Holidays, dances and traditions
November 20: Celebrates the beginning of the Mexican Revolution.
1st to 15 August: Celebrates the holiday of the Virgin of the Assumption.
September 15 and 16: The native holidays are celebrated.
Other holidays: Also the carnival holidays are celebrated at the beginning of every year and the Christmas holidays.

Crafts
Wood furniture and harness-maker's shop.

Gastronomy
Typical foods of the municipality are: morisqueta, iguana soup, fish soup (bagre, carpa), corn tamales with cream (uchepos), corundas de maíz with cheese and cream, tacos de res y chivo tipo barbacoa, enchiladas con pollo y cecina.

References

External links

Página web de Parácuaro Michoacan 

Municipalities of Michoacán